The  or  (Dutch) is a major thoroughfare in Brussels, Belgium. It is named in honour of King Leopold II's eldest daughter, Princess Louise (1858–1924).

The Avenue Louise is one of the most prestigious and expensive avenues in Brussels, lined with high-end fashion stores and boutiques. It also houses many embassies and offices. The avenue is served by the metro station Louise/Louiza at one end (on lines 2 and 6), as well as the tram lines 8 and 93, which run its entire length.

History

Construction
The construction of the Avenue Louise was commissioned in 1847 as a monumental avenue bordered by chestnut trees that would allow easy access from Brussels' city centre to the popular recreational area of the Bois de la Cambre/Ter Kamerenbos. It was also to be the first Haussmann-esque artery of the city. Its name was chosen in honour of King Leopold II's eldest daughter, Princess Louise, as is the /, a major square located in its upper part. The /, another square on the avenue, is named in honour of her younger sister, Princess Stéphanie.

Originally, fierce resistance to the project was put up by the town of Ixelles—then, as now, a separate municipality (local authority) from the City of Brussels—through whose territory the avenue was to run. After years of fruitless negotiations, Brussels finally annexed the narrow band of land needed for the avenue, in addition to the Bois de la Cambre itself, in 1864. That decision accounts for the unusual shape of today's City of Brussels and for the separation of Ixelles into two separate areas.

World War II

During World War II, following the German invasion of Belgium, Brussels was occupied by the German military. The Nazi security organisation, the Sicherheitspolizei-Sicherheitsdienst (Sipo-SD), of which the Gestapo was a part, set up their Brussels headquarters on the Avenue Louise. They occupied numbers 347, 418, 453 and 510; initially their headquarters were at number 453, in the Résidence Belvédère.

On 20 January 1943, Baron Jean de Sélys Longchamps, a Brussels-born fighter pilot in the Royal Air Force, mounted a solo attack on the headquarters at number 453. Benefiting from the wide avenues, and the large height of the apartment block relative to the neighbouring buildings, he flew his Hawker Typhoon at a low altitude straight towards the building, firing the plane's 20 mm cannons, before returning to England. Following this attack, the SD moved their headquarters to number 347. The cellars at this address were used to detain and interrogate captured members of the Belgian resistance. The torture which took place there brought the Avenue Louise's name considerable infamy at the time. A monument to Baron de Selys Longchamps now stands in front of number 453.

Contemporary
The avenue was redeveloped after 1950 in preparation for the 1958 Brussels World's Fair (Expo '58), tunnelling the main intersections and offering direct access to the Small Ring (Brussels' inner ring road). The northern part is sunken and has three level crossings. The three tunnels are, from north to south: the Stéphanie Tunnel, the Bailli Tunnel and the short Vleurgat Tunnel.

Much of the post-war configuration still exists today. It implies that no metro line runs through the avenue, despite its high built density and its multiple functions of shops/offices/housing, the latter being in a way replaced by these tunnels. However, tram lines 8 and 93 operate on their own site from the Place Stéphanie to the Woluwe depot.

Although regarded as a prestigious street, at night it has a reputation for unauthorised prostitution.

Landmarks
The Avenue Louise is home to many upmarket shops, restaurants and offices. From north to south, notable landmarks include:

 ~ /, a crucial transportation nexus, including a tramway and metro station. The Law Courts of Brussels are located nearby.
 ~ /, another extremely busy square surrounded by luxury shops. The tree-bordered part of the avenue begins there.
 No. 124: Louise Tower, also known as the Generali Tower, one of the tallest office buildings in Brussels
 No. 224: Hôtel Solvay (1895–1900), a large Art Nouveau town house by Victor Horta, and a UNESCO World Heritage Site
 ~ / (which leads downhill to the nearby Place Eugène Flagey/Eugène Flageyplein)
 No. 324–326: Blue Tower (1976), a functionalist office building by 
 No. 346: Hôtel Max Hallet (1904), another Art Nouveau town house by Victor Horta
 ~ the scenic King's Garden, a garden descending toward the nearby Ixelles Ponds
 ~ Olivier Strebelle's 16-tonne bronze sculpture Le Phénix 44 commemorating the anniversary of the liberation of Brussels, which stands athwart the roundabout at the King's Garden
 ~ /, which features several statues, the entrance to La Cambre Abbey, and the massive IT Tower
 ~ a roundabout flanked by two twin neoclassical former toll pavilions of the Namur Gate ending the avenue. Beyond it lies the Bois de la Cambre/Ter Kamerenbos.
 the nearby Pro-Cathedral of the Holy Trinity, part of the Church of England

The "Louise bottleneck"

The  part of the Avenue Louise between the / and the / is called  in French ("the Louise bottleneck"). With two tramway lines and thousands of cars sharing this narrow segment of the avenue, large traffic jams occur during rush hours. The problem was already obvious in the early 1980s, so a tram tunnel under the bottleneck was built along with the metro station on the Place Louise. However, construction was abandoned toward its end due to protests of local businesses fearing losses if patrons were to be diverted through a tunnel.

The nearly-completed, vast tramway tunnel under the Louise bottleneck remains unused as of 2009. Various solutions to the traffic problem have been considered. One proposes pedestrianising the whole segment, with trams running on the surface and only delivery vehicles authorised at certain hours. Another, much more costly idea, involves finishing the tunnel and diverting all trams underground.

Tramway lines 8 and 93 run the entire length of the avenue, all on segregated track except in the short "goulet Louise" section.

Embassies
The Avenue Louise houses many embassies, including those of:

 No. 130: Dominican Republic
 No. 176: Bolivia
 No. 181: Montenegro
 No. 225: Argentina
 No. 250: Bahrain
 No. 350: Brazil
 No. 363: Ecuador
 No. 379: Suriname
 No. 425: Croatia
 No. 475: Paraguay
 No. 489: Costa Rica

Representative Offices
 No. 284/286: Northern Cyprus

See also
 List of streets in Brussels
 Neoclassical architecture in Belgium
 Art Nouveau in Brussels
 Art Deco in Brussels
 History of Brussels
 Belgium in "the long nineteenth century"

References

Notes

Bibliography

External links

  (Images, etc.)
 History and architecture of Avenue Louise (St Gilles) - on the irismonument site - l'inventaire du patrimoine architectural de la Région de Bruxelles-Capitale
 History and architecture of Avenue Louise (Brussels southern extension) - on the irismonument site -l'inventaire du patrimoine architectural de la Région de Bruxelles-Capitale

Louise
City of Brussels
19th century in Brussels
Shopping districts and streets in Belgium